Chatsworth is a civil parish in the Derbyshire Dales district of Derbyshire, England.   The parish contains 34 listed buildings that are recorded in the National Heritage List for England.  Of these, seven are listed at Grade I, the highest of the three grades, three are at Grade II*, the middle grade, and the others are at Grade II, the lowest grade.  The centrepiece of the parish is Chatsworth House, which is listed, and all the other listed buildings are in the surrounding grounds, gardens, or park.


Key

Buildings

References

Citations

Sources

 

Lists of listed buildings in Derbyshire